Most units of the Royal Air Force (RAF) are identified by a two character alphabetical or alpha- numeric combination squadron code. Usually, that code is painted on the aircraft belonging to that unit. The squadron code is usually presented along with an individual letter or character to form a call sign for the particular aircraft.  Location of the call sign combination has usually been on the rear fuselage next to the RAF roundel.

In instances when an unusually large numbers of aircraft comprise the squadron, multiple squadron codes have been used.

Other air forces, especially those from other Commonwealth countries, have often used similar systems of identification.  During the Second World War, when units from other air forces were attached to the RAF – such as the Article XV squadrons (also known as "400 series squadrons") – their squadron codes were often changed, to avoid confusion with RAF units.

Squadron codes

A-E

F- J

K-O

P-T

U-Z

Numbers

* = RAAF/RCAF unit that was not under RAF operational control.

Radio call signs

Transport Command 'O' series
Transport Command RAF applied the following three letter call-signs to its aircraft from 1944. Individual aircraft were given letter suffixes, making the code a four letter sequence.

Transport Command 'MO' series
From 1945 RAF Transport Command pre-fixed the three letter call-signs with M. With individual aircraft allocated letter suffixes, the call-signs became five letter sequences.
Data from:

See also

Royal Air Force

List of Royal Air Force aircraft squadrons
List of Royal Air Force aircraft independent flights
List of conversion units of the Royal Air Force
List of Royal Air Force Glider units
List of Royal Air Force Operational Training Units
List of Royal Air Force schools
List of Royal Air Force units & establishments
List of RAF squadron codes
List of RAF Regiment units
List of Battle of Britain squadrons
List of wings of the Royal Air Force
Royal Air Force roundels

Army Air Corps

List of Army Air Corps aircraft units

Fleet Air Arm

List of Fleet Air Arm aircraft squadrons
List of Fleet Air Arm groups
List of aircraft units of the Royal Navy
List of aircraft wings of the Royal Navy

Others

List of Air Training Corps squadrons
University Air Squadron
Air Experience Flight
Volunteer Gliding Squadron
United Kingdom military aircraft serial numbers
United Kingdom aircraft test serials
British military aircraft designation systems

References

Citations

Bibliography

Further reading
 Bowyer, Michael J.F. and John D.R. Rawlings. Squadron Codes, 1937-56. Cambridge, Cambridgeshire, UK: Patrick Stephens Ltd., 1979. .
 Delve, Ken. The Source Book of the RAF. Shrewsbury, Shropshire, UK: Airlife Publishing, 1994. .
 Flintham, Vic and Andrew Thomas. Combat Codes: A Full Explanation and Listing of British, Commonwealth and Allied Air Force Unit Codes Since 1938. Shrewsbury, Shropshire, UK: Airlife Publishing, 2003. .
 Halley, James J. The Squadrons of the Royal Air Force & Commonwealth, 1918-1988. Tonbridge, Kent, UK: Air Britain (Historians) Ltd., 1988. .
 Jefford, C.G. RAF Squadrons, a Comprehensive record of the Movement and Equipment of all RAF Squadrons and their Antecedents since 1912. Shropshire, Shropshire, UK: Airlife Publishing, 1988 (second edition 2001). .
 Moyes, Philip J.R. Bomber Squadrons of the RAF and their Aircraft. London: Macdonald and Jane's (Publishers) Ltd., 2nd edition 1976. .
 Rawlings, John D.R. Coastal, Support and Special Squadrons of the RAF and their Aircraft. London: Jane's Publishing Company Ltd., 1982. .
 Rawlings, John D.R. Fighter Squadrons of the RAF and their Aircraft''. London: Macdonald & Jane's (Publishers) Ltd., 1969 (2nd edition 1976, reprinted 1978). .

External links
RAF Squadron Codes during World War II
Australian War Memorial, n.d., The Royal Australian Air Force Squadron Codes.
a list of current squadrons from the RAF website
RAF - University Air Squadrons
UBAS - University of Birmingham Air Squadron
UGSAS - Universities of Glasgow and Strathclyde Air Squadron
BUAS - Bristol UAS
CUAS - Cambridge UAS
EMUAS - East Midlands UAS
ESUAS - East Scotland UAS
LUAS - Liverpool UAS
MASUAS - Manchester and Salford UAS
ULAS - University of London Air Squadron
OUAS - Oxford UAS
SUAS - Southampton UAS
Southampton University Air Squadron - Wiki
UWAS - Wales UAS
YUAS - Yorkshire UAS

Squadron codes
Royal Air Force squadrons

Squadron
Royal Air Force squadron codes